Da Internz are a production team originating from Chicago, Illinois. The duo is composed of Marcos "Kosine" Palacios and Ernest Tuo Clark. Da Internz describe their sound as "gourmet ratchet", meaning imperfect but excellent.

Background
Both men state that they were born to make music. Marcos’ mother put him in piano at six years old. He picked up the saxophone in 5th grade and then the drums in 8th. This duo is from Chicago but is currently based out of Los Angeles, California. Their sound can be found across many genres like hip-hop, pop and neo soul.

The team came together in 2004 when Kosine was a student at Columbia College Chicago and Tuo was working for Conquer Records in Management and as an A&R. Upon graduation in 2006, Marcos was hired at Columbia as a professor of hip-hop beat making. He held this position for two and a half years.

The team had their first major break in 2009 with Mims’ sophomore album, Guilt.  The two served as co-executive producers for the project, where they had seven songs. The album’s first single, "Move, If You Wanna", was released in 2008. Kos and Tuo, as they are known, received ASCAP (American Society of Composers, Authors and Publishers) awards in 2013 for producing, "A$$" by Big Sean and "Birthday Cake" by Rihanna, two of their biggest songs. In addition to the ASCAP awards, Da Internz has had several Grammy nominations. My World 2.0 received a Grammy nomination for best pop vocal album in 2011. Life Is Good, by Nas, received a Grammy nomination for best rap album. Tamar Braxton's Love And War earned a Grammy nomination for best urban contemporary album. Love in the Future by John Legend was also Grammy nominated for best R&B album. Lastly, "Anaconda" by Nicki Minaj, was nominated for best rap song for the 2015 Grammy awards.

Influences
They cite, Prince, Stevie Wonder, Quincy Jones, Gerald Albright, Donny Hathaway, Ella Fitzgerald, Charlie Parker, Cannonball Adderley, Charles Mingus and Michael Jackson as musical influences. In addition to this, Kos and Tuo, are avid readers. Dr. Myles Munroe and Malcolm Gladwell are among their favorite authors.

Production discography

Singles
 2009: "Move (If You Wanna)" (MIMS)
 2010: "Waiting Outside the Lines" (Greyson Chance)
 2011: "Benefit of a Fool" (Boyz II Men)
 2011: "Birthday Cake" (Rihanna) 
 2011: "Dance (A$$)" (Big Sean)
 2012: "The Don" (Nas)
 2012: "Marry Go Round" (Nelly featuring Chris Brown)
 2012: "Mona Lisa" (Big Sean)
 2012: "88" (Diggy Simmons)
 2013: "I Would" (Justin Bieber)
 2013: "Paradise" (Cassie featuring Wiz Khalifa)
 2014: "Anaconda" (Nicki Minaj)
 2014: "Good Lovin" (Ludacris)
 2015: "If I Don't Have You" (Tamar Braxton)

2009

Mims - Guilt 
 02. "The Skit"
 03. "On & On"
 04. "Love Rollercoaster" (feat. LeToya Luckett)
 10. "Makin' Money"
 11. "In My Life (Why Oh Why)"
 14. "I Do" (feat. Nice & Smooth)

2010

Jesse McCartney - Have It All 
 11. "Seasons (My Love Will Never Change)"

Justin Bieber - My World 2.0 
 8. "Eenie Meenie" (Writing Credit)

2011

Greyson Chance - Hold On 'til the Night 
 09. "Stranded"

Boyz II Men - Twenty 
 07. (Disc One) "Benefit of a Fool"

2012

Big Sean - Detroit 
 10. "Sellin' Dreams" (feat. Chris Brown)

Nas - Life Is Good 
 11. "The Don" (produced with Heavy D & Salaam Remi)

2013

Cassie - RockaByeBaby 
 02. "Paradise" (feat. Wiz Khalifa)

Ludacris - #IDGAF 
 07. "Dancing Dirty" (feat. Chris Brown)

The-Dream - IV Play 
 06. "Where Have You Been" (feat. Kelly Rowland) (produced with The-Dream and Miykal Snoddy)

Mayer Hawthorne - Where Does This Door Go 
 02. "Back Seat Lover" (Produced with Mayer Hawthorne)

Big Sean - Hall Of Fame 
 08. "Mona Lisa"
 10. "MILF" (feat. Juicy J and Nicki Minaj)

John Legend - Love in the Future 
 04. "Made To Love" (feat. Kimbra) (produced with Dave Tozer, Nana Kwabena, and Kanye West)

Tamar Braxton - Love and War 
 02. "Tip Toe"
 07. "She Did That"

James Arthur - James Arthur 
 09. "Suicide"

Sevyn Streeter - Call Me Crazy, But... 
 03. "Sex on the Ceilling"
 05. "B.A.N.S."

2014

JoJo - #LoveJo 
 01. "Intro"
 02. "Caught Up in the Rapture"
 03. "Take Me Home"

G Herbo - Welcome To Fazoland 
 08. "On My Soul" (feat. Lil Reese)

Candice Glover - Music Speaks 
 09. "Coulda Been Me" (produced with Darkchild and Hot Sauce)

Jennifer Lopez - A.K.A. 
Leftover
 00. "Love Line" (feat. Robin Thicke & Wiz Khalifa)

Trey Songz - Trigga 
 13. "Change Your Mind"
 15. "Love Around The World"
 19. "Serial"

Marsha Ambrosius - Friends & Lovers 
 02. "So Good"
 04. "69"
 06. "How Much More (Interlude)"
 11. "Kiss & Fuck (Interlude)"
 15. "OMG I Miss You"

Tank - Stronger 
 10. "If That's What It Takes"

Big Sean 
 00. "Jit/Juke" (produced with Nate Fox and L&F)

Nicki Minaj - The Pinkprint 
 12. "Anaconda"

2015

Big Sean - Dark Sky Paradise 
 08. "Stay Down" (produced with L&F)

Trey Songz - Intermission
 02. "Don't Play"

Ludacris - Ludaversal 
 02. "Grass Is Always Greener"
 07. "Get Lit" (produced with Lil Ronnie)

Sevyn Streeter - Shoulda Been There, Pt. 1
 06. "Love in Competition"

Tamar Braxton - Calling All Lovers 
 07. "If I Don't Have You"
 17. "A.S.A.P." (produced with Snoddy)

2016

BJ the Chicago Kid - In My Mind
 14. "Falling on My Face" (produced with Aaron Michael Cox)

Big Sean & Jhene Aiko - TWENTY88 
 02. "Selfish" (produced with Flippa)
 04. "Push It" (produced with Flippa)
 06. "Talk Show" (produced with Flippa)

Trap Beckham - Now That's What I Call Music! 59 
 22. "Birthday Chick"

Ro James - Eldorado 
 03. "Burn Slow" 
 13. "Eldorado"

Grace - FMA 
 01. Church On Sunday

T-Pain  
 00. Officially Yours

2017

Ludacris 
 00. "Vitamin D" (feat. Ty Dolla Sign)

DaniLeigh - Summer with Friends 
 07. "Lurkin"

Vic Mensa - The Manuscript 
 03. "Rollin' Like a Stoner" (produced with Rance of 1500 or Nothin')

Sevyn Streeter - Girl Disrupted 
 06. "Soon As I Get Home"

Trap Beckham 
 00. "Lil Booties Matter"

G Herbo - Humble Beast 
 07. "Man Now"
 14. "This n That" (feat. Jeremih & Lil Yachty)

Tank - Savage 
 07. "Stay Where You Are"

References

External links

 
 
 

American hip hop record producers
American musical duos
Record production duos
Songwriting teams
Midwest hip hop groups
Musical groups from Chicago
African-American musical groups
Production discographies
Record producers from Illinois